Football at the 2006 Asian Games was held in Doha, Qatar from 18 November to 15 December 2006. The opening match was played 14 days prior to the opening ceremony. In this tournament, some 30 teams played in the men's competition, and 8 teams participated in women's competition.

Turkmenistan, and Yemen withdrew from the competition before playing their first match. The organisation announced a new competition format because of this. Instead of only the group winners of the first round to go through to the second round, now also both runners-up qualified.

Later India also announced their retirement, however they remained in the tournament on a "no cost to government basis". Iran was taken out of competition prior to their first match, due to a suspension by FIFA. However, FIFA lifted the suspension on Iran under-23 team on 26 November 2006 so they returned to the original Group D stage.

Age limit for the men teams is under-23, same as the age limit in football competitions in Olympic Games, while three overage players are allowed among each squad.

Schedule

Medalists

Medal table

Draw
The draw ceremony for the team sports was held on 7 September 2006 at Doha.

Men
Eight teams who did not enter 2002 had to play in Round 1; 22 other teams qualify directly for the tournament proper.

Round 1 – Group A
 
 
 
 

Round 1 – Group B
 
 
 
 

Round 2 – Group A
 
 
 
 1st Round 1 – Group A

Round 2 – Group B
 
 
 
 

Round 2 – Group C
 
 
 *
 

Round 2 – Group D
 
 
 
 

Round 2 – Group E
 
 
 
 1st Round 1 – Group B

Round 2 – Group F
 
 
 *
 

* Turkmenistan and Yemen withdrew from the competition and were replaced by 2nd placed teams from Round 1.

Women

Group A
 
 
 *
 

Group B
 
 
 *
 
 

* Maldives withdrew, following this Thailand moved to Group A to balance the number of teams in each group.

Squads

Final standing

Men

Women

Impact on Qatar 
Scholars suggest that the 2006 Asian Games had long-term consequences for Qatar by boosting its tourist economy, aiding in economic diversification away from oil, and encouraging infrastructural development, while anticipating Qatar's bid for the 2022 FIFA World Cup.

References

 Official men football schedule
 Official women football schedule

 
Asia
2006
2006
2006 Asian Games events
2006–07 in Qatari football